Kim Mi-Jung (born March 29, 1971 in Masan, Gyeongsangnam-do) is a retired female South Korean judoka. She was a shot putter in high school but changed to be a judoka at the age of 17, and in a year Kim was selected to be a member of the South Korean national judo team in 1989.

Next year, Kim won bronze at the 1990 Asian Games in Beijing, and in 1991 she became her first world champion in the 72 kg division at the World Championships in Barcelona.

At the 1992 Summer Olympics she finally won the Olympic gold medal in the women's Half Heavyweight (-72 kg) category.

Kim retired from competitive judo after winning the Asian Game gold medal in 1994. She has been serving as a judo coach and professor for Yong-In University, South Korea.

She is married to judoka Kim Byung-joo.

References

External links
 

Judoka at the 1992 Summer Olympics
Olympic judoka of South Korea
Olympic gold medalists for South Korea
1971 births
Living people
Olympic medalists in judo
Asian Games medalists in judo
Judoka at the 1990 Asian Games
Judoka at the 1994 Asian Games
South Korean female judoka
Medalists at the 1992 Summer Olympics
Asian Games gold medalists for South Korea
Asian Games bronze medalists for South Korea
Medalists at the 1990 Asian Games
Medalists at the 1994 Asian Games
Sportspeople from South Gyeongsang Province